Carina Lorenzo (born 4 June 1994) is a Dominican team handball player. She plays for the club Maquiteria, and on the Dominican Republic national team. She represented Dominica at the 2013 World Women's Handball Championship in Serbia, where the Dominican Republic placed 23rd.

References

1994 births
Living people
Dominican Republic female handball players
Central American and Caribbean Games gold medalists for the Dominican Republic
Competitors at the 2018 Central American and Caribbean Games
Handball players at the 2019 Pan American Games
Pan American Games competitors for the Dominican Republic
Central American and Caribbean Games medalists in handball